Boris Vukčević (born 16 March 1990) is a German former professional footballer of Croatian descent who played as a midfielder. Due to the aftermaths of a car accident in 2012 he retired prematurely in 2014.

Club career
He made his debut in the Fußball-Bundesliga on 23 May 2009 for TSG 1899 Hoffenheim in a game against FC Schalke 04.

Personal life
On 28 September 2012, Vukčević was involved in a traffic accident near Bammental, when his Mercedes-Benz C63 AMG Coupé collided with a truck. He underwent an emergency surgery at the University Hospital Heidelberg and was placed in an induced coma. His condition was described as critical. According to a joint press release from the prosecutor's office and the police, the cause of the accident was hypoglycemia. On November 16, 2012, he was reported as no longer being in the coma.

It was not the first time that Vukčević being involved in a car accident due to hypoglycemia. On 18 October 2010, on the state road near Bad Rappenau his car collided with the trailer of a truck after hitting the guard rail several times. On 16 November, Vukcevic awoke from his coma and began communicating with his family.

In April 2014 he made his first public appearance after the car accident when he attended a home of fixture of his club against FC Augsburg. At this occasion he also expressed his desire to play football again. On 1 June 2014 although 1899 Hoffenheim released that his expiring contract wouldn't be extended. However the club would support him finding his way back to a normal life and promised him a new contract when he would be able to play football again.

He retired prematurely at the age of 24.

References

External links
 Boris Vukčević at kicker.de 
 
 

1990 births
Living people
People from Osijek
Croatian emigrants to Germany
Naturalized citizens of Germany
German footballers
Germany youth international footballers
Germany under-21 international footballers
Bundesliga players
Regionalliga players
TSG 1899 Hoffenheim II players
TSG 1899 Hoffenheim players
Association football midfielders